Canfield is the name of several unincorporated communities in the U.S. state of West Virginia.

Canfield, Braxton County, West Virginia
Canfield, Randolph County, West Virginia